Hurricane Raymond was the only major hurricane in the eastern Pacific in 2013 and briefly threatened the southwestern coast of Mexico before recurving back out to sea. The seventeenth named storm and eighth hurricane of the annual cyclone season, Raymond developed from a tropical wave on October 20 south of Acapulco, Mexico. Within favorable conditions for tropical cyclogenesis, Raymond quickly intensified, attaining tropical storm intensity and later hurricane intensity within a day of cyclogenesis. On October 21, the hurricane reached its peak intensity with winds of 125 mph (205 km/h). A blocking ridge forced the hurricane to the southwest, while at the same time Raymond began to quickly weaken due to wind shear. The following day, the tropical cyclone weakened to tropical storm status. After tracking westward, Raymond reentered more favorable conditions, allowing it to intensify back to hurricane strength on October 27 while curving northward. The hurricane reached a secondary peak intensity with winds of 105 mph (165 km/h) several hours later. Deteriorating atmospheric conditions resulted in Raymond weakening for a final time, and on October 30, the National Hurricane Center (NHC) declared the tropical cyclone to have dissipated.

Despite remaining offshore, Raymond's close proximity to the Mexican coast was enough to prompt tropical cyclone warnings and watches. Due to the threat of rainfall, residents from 81 municipalities in Mexico were ordered to evacuate out of flood-prone regions. Precipitation from Raymond peaked at 7.63 in (194 mm) near Acapulco within a two-day period. Minor flooding resulted from the outer rainbands of the hurricane. Though no deaths were reported, 585 people were rendered homeless. Following the storm, the Mexican government declared a state of emergency for 10 municipalities in Guerrero.

Meteorological history

The area of disturbed weather that led to the formation of Hurricane Raymond was initially discernible as a broad area of low pressure in association with disorganized convection—shower and thunderstorm activity—near Central America on October 17, 2013. Tracking west to west-northwestward, environmental conditions were expected to be conducive for the development of a tropical cyclone and the system was quickly given a medium chance of development within a five-day interval by the National Hurricane Center (NHC) accordingly. Over the subsequent 48 hours, convective activity steadily increased and organized while the low-pressure center became better defined, prompting the NHC to raise formation chances to the high category. The system turned towards the northwest during the morning of October 19 while continuing to develop; following a combination of satellite intensity estimates and satellite images, the disturbance was upgraded to Tropical Depression Seventeen-E at 0000 UTC. Despite warming cloudtops, the overall cloud pattern of the depression improved by early the following morning and it was subsequently upgraded to a tropical storm, receiving the name Raymond, at 0600 UTC. At this time, the cyclone was positioned roughly 185 mi (300 km) south-southwest of Acapulco, Mexico.

Following designation, Raymond continued to become better organized. Deep convection continued to increase over the circulation center while microwave imagery depicted the formative stages of an inner core. Shortly thereafter, the system began a period of rapid intensification that was described by NHC forecasters as "astounding" and "impressive". At 0000 UTC on October 21, Raymond was upgraded to a Category 1 hurricane; six hours later, it was upgraded to a Category 2 hurricane as a small yet well-defined eye became obvious on both visible and infrared satellite imagery. In conjunction with satellite intensity estimates, the hurricane was upgraded to a major hurricane—a Category 3 or higher on the Saffir-Simpson hurricane wind scale—making Raymond the first of the 2013 Pacific hurricane season and the first in the West Hemisphere during 2013. Slowing to a halt, the system temporarily ceased its intensification trend as it underwent an eyewall replacement cycle. By the afternoon hours of October 21, however, the system increased in organization, noted by a more symmetric and warm eye. At 1800 UTC, Raymond attained its peak intensity with maximum sustained winds of 125 mph (205 km/h) and a minimum barometric pressure of 951 mb (hPa; 28.08 inHg). Thereafter, an increase in vertical wind shear from the south-southwest caused the system to begin a weakening trend. At 0600 UTC on October 22, Raymond was lowered to a Category 2 hurricane. That afternoon, data from an Air Force hurricane hunter aircraft indicated that the system was weaker than forecast, a low-end Category 1 hurricane. Turning west-southwest around the southern periphery of a ridge near Baja California Peninsula, Raymond weakened to a tropical storm at 0600 UTC.

Continued wind shear on October 23 caused the low-level center to become exposed to view while large arc clouds, indicative of dry air, filled the western semicircle of the disheveled tropical cyclone. The following day, bursts of deep shower and thunderstorm activity occurred over the center; however, no change in intensity was noted. Upper-level outflow began to expand in all directions as the shear direction flipped to a southeasterly direction. Despite forecasts of intensification, Raymond failed to change much in intensity over the following 48 hours, perhaps a result of abnormally warm mid-level temperatures. By late on October 26, however, convective banding began to increase while deep convection developed over the low-level center. The cloud scene transitioned to a central dense overcast by 1200 UTC on October 27 while an eye became visible on microwave imagery; in conjunction with satellite intensity estimates, Raymond was upgraded to a Category 1 hurricane once again, while positioned 725 mi (1,165 km) south-southwest of the southern tip of Baja California Peninsula. Early on October 28, Raymond reached a secondary peak intensity with winds of 105 mph (165 km/h) and a pressure of 971 mb (hPa; 28.67 inHg), having developed a cloud-obscured eye and a central dense overcast. Early on October 29, increasing wind shear disrupted the convection and weakened the hurricane back to tropical storm status. Although the thunderstorms briefly increased on that day, continued shear imparted further weakening. Raymond weakened to tropical depression status on October 30 after the circulation had become elongated and removed from the convection. Later that day, the depression degenerated into a remnant low-pressure area. During the next two days, Raymond's remnant low slowly curved towards the west, before dissipating early on November 1.

Preparations and impact
Due to the threat of Raymond, an "orange" alert was issues for portions of Guerrero and Michoacan and a "yellow" alert was issued for much of Colima and Jalisco. The port of Costa Grande was closed for all small craft and sporting activities. The port of Manzanillo was ordered to be closed on October 21. An emergency declaration was issued for 9 municipalities in Guerrero by its Governor Angel Aguirre Rivero, while residents in 81 municipalities in proximity to the hurricane were asked to evacuate flood-prone areas. Around 25 shelters were opened; officials evacuated over 400 people those shelters, including 100 near Acapulco. Around 3,000 military members were transported prior to the arrival of the system. Schools and classes in most coastal communities west of Acapulco, including Zihuatanejo. In Guerrero alone, classes were suspended in 10 municipalities and throughout Michocan, classes were suspended as well.

On October 21, the outer rainbands of Hurricane Raymond brought heavy rains to the Mexican coast, resulting in minor flooding. A total of 21 homes were flooded, resulting in the evacuation of five persons. Three trees fell down and two walls collapsed. Moreover, 585 people were rendered as homeless. Some streets in Acapulco were closed. Due to Raymond, a state of emergency was declared for 10 municipalities in Guerrero.

See also
 List of Pacific hurricanes
 Other storms of the same name
 Timeline of the 2013 Pacific hurricane season
 Hurricane Blas (2022)

References

External links

The National Hurricane Center's advisory archive for Hurricane Raymond

2013 in Mexico
Raymond
Raymond (2013)
Raymond (2013)
Raymond